Parque Bustamante is an underground metro station on the Line 5 of the Santiago Metro, in Santiago, Chile. It is located beneath Parque Bustamante, which gives the name to the station.
The station was opened on 5 April 1997 as part of the inaugural section of the line, from Baquedano to Bellavista de La Florida.

Originally the platform side walls featured mosaics that were vaguely designed to resemble trees. That decoration was disguised by the mural-like artwork named Vida y Trabajo, which was completed in 2008. Another artwork installed here is named El Sitio de las Cosas by Pablo Rivera, which is made of polyester resin coated with an applied copper patina.

References

Santiago Metro stations
Railway stations opened in 1997
Santiago Metro Line 5